Andrea Gámiz and Paula Cristina Gonçalves were the defending champions but chose not to participate.

Nuria Brancaccio and Lisa Pigato won the title, defeating Zhibek Kulambayeva and Diāna Marcinkēviča in the final, 6–4, 6–1.

Seeds

Draw

Draw

References
Main Draw

Internazionali Femminili di Brescia - Doubles